Guards Armoured Mechanized Brigade (Croatian: Gardijska oklopno-mehanizirana brigada (GOMBR)) is a mechanized infantry brigade of the Croatian Army based in Vinkovci, Eastern Croatia. The Guards Armoured Mechanized Brigade is the largest tactical unit of the Croatian Army and is commanded by Brigadier General Mijo Validžić.

History
The Guards Armoured Mechanized Brigade (GOMBR) is the successor of the 3rd Guards Armoured Mechanized Brigade (2003-2007), which was formed with the merger of three wartime guards brigades of the Croatian army: 

 3rd Guards Brigade "Kune";
 7th Guards Brigade "Pume"; and
 5th Guards Brigade "Sokolovi".

Mission and tasks
The core mission of the Guards Armoured Mechanized Brigade is to defend the sovereignty and territorial integrity of the Republic of Croatia; develop and maintain the capacity to participate in international military operations; and to be prepared to assist civilian institutions in the event of natural and technical-technological disasters.

The main tasks of the Guards Armoured Mechanized Brigade, are to:

 Conduct offensive operations;
 Conduct stabilization operations;
 Conduct security and force protection operations;
 Establishment of command and control systems;
 Ensure unit sustainability; and
 Support to civilian institutions in the face of natural and technical-technological disasters.

Current composition 
 Headquarters Company (Vinkovci)
 Tank Battalion "Kune" (Đakovo)
 Armored Battalion of the Guards Armored Mechanized Brigade
 1st Mechanized Battalion "Sokolovi" (Našice)
 2nd Mechanized Battalion "Pume" (Varaždin )
 Mixed Artillery Battalion (Bjelovar)
 Engineer Battalion (Vinkovci)
 Military Intelligence Company (Vinkovci)
 Air Defence Battalion (Vinkovci)
 Signals Company (Vinkovci)
 Logistics Company (Vinkovci)

The Guards Armoured Mechanized Brigade is composed of seven battalions and totals approximately 4,000 personal.

See also
 2nd Guards Brigade (Croatia)
 3rd Guards Brigade (Croatia)
 5th Guards Brigade (Croatia)
 7th Guards Brigade (Croatia)
 9th Guards Brigade (Croatia) (also known as 6th)

Sources
 Hrvatski vojnik, 23 December 2009,

References

Brigades of Croatia
Military units and formations established in 2007